100 Foot Wave is an American documentary television series directed by Chris Smith, revolving around big-wave surfer Garrett McNamara as he traveled to Nazaré, Portugal with the goal of conquering a 100-foot wave. It premiered on HBO on July 18, 2021.

In August 2021, HBO renewed the series for a second season.

Synopsis
McNamara's career as a big-wave surfer is chronicled. The series focuses on his time in Nazaré, where he hopes to find and conquer a 100-foot wave. He works alongside Nazaré locals to transform the town into a surfing destination known for its immense waves. Other big-wave surfers are also profiled.

Episodes

Production
Smith was approached by Joe Lewis to direct a documentary feature film about McNamara. However, when the first cut of the film turned out to be six hours long, Smith felt it would be better suited as a docuseries. In February 2021, it was announced that a 6-episode documentary series would be produced by Topic Studios and distributed by HBO.

Awards and nominations

References

External links
 
 

2021 American television series debuts
2020s American documentary television series
HBO original programming
HBO Sports
Documentary television series about sports
Television shows set in Portugal
Surfing mass media
Primetime Emmy Award-winning television series